Robert Edward Hogan (April 6, 1860 – January 22, 1932) was an American professional baseball pitcher. He played one game in Major League Baseball for the St. Louis Brown Stockings in 1882.  He pitched a complete game in a loss, allowing seven runs, one of which was earned.

External links

1860 births
1932 deaths
19th-century baseball players
St. Louis Brown Stockings (AA) players
Leavenworth Soldiers players
Denver Mountain Lions players
Denver (minor league baseball) players
St. Joseph Reds players
Baseball players from St. Louis